1-(3,4-Methylenedioxybenzyl)piperazine (MDBZP, piperonylpiperazine) is a chemical compound of the piperazine chemical class related to benzylpiperazine (BZP).  MDBZP has been sold as a designer drug and has even been found as an ingredient in street Ecstasy pills.

See also 
 3,4-Methylenedioxy-N-methylamphetamine (MDMA)
 Substituted piperazine

References

External links
 

Benzodioxoles
Designer drugs
Piperazines